Solidarité (French, 'solidarity') may refer to:
 "Solidarité" ("Solidarity"), a song, the subject of We Are One (film), 2020
 AS Solidarité, a Gabonese football club
 SolidaritéS, or Solidarity (Switzerland), a left-wing political party in the French-speaking part of Switzerland

See also

Solidarity (disambiguation)
 Solidarité Française ('French Solidarity'), a former French far-right league founded in 1933 
 Solidarités international, a non-profit organization